Gudeodiscus cyrtochilus is a species of air-breathing land snail, a terrestrial pulmonate gastropod mollusk in the family Plectopylidae.

Distribution
The distribution of Gudeodiscus cyrtochilus includes Vietnam.

Ecology
It is a ground-dwelling species as all other plectopylid snails in Vietnam.

It co-occur with other plectopylids in Vietnam: with Sicradiscus mansuyi.

References

External links

Plectopylidae
Gastropods described in 1909